Kanshian is a village located in Mansehra District, Khyber-Pakhtunkhwa province of Pakistan. It is a village of Union Council Garlat of tehsil Balakot to the south east of the Balakot city. It lies in the series of mountains connecting the Neelum Valley in Pakistani-held Kashmir to the Kaghan Valley.

Etymology
According to oral traditions, the word Kanshian is after the name of a person "Kansha Ram". He is said to have been the Hindu merchant who lived here in about British Period. However, there is no strong evidence for this assumption. However, there are references to the existence of such a Hindu community in the region during the Sikh and British Period. This community established Hattis ہٹـی (Small shop) in the area.

The 1900s British Army maps mention its name as 'Kashi'

Geography
The village consists of rugged mountainous terrain. Topography comprises mounds, steeps and a large area washed by the hill streams. There is a very small, relatively plain area in the village.
It virtually carries its boundaries to the ridgelines of surrounding mountains. To the east, it is shaded by two peaks, Lo-e-Dandi and Butti, 10,465 and 10,890 feet above sea level respectively. Between these two, from Gehal (a beautiful plain area, a summer pasture), are the passes allowing villagers to Kutla Valley, a sub valley of the Neelum Valley (Azad Jammu and Kashmir).
The weather becomes very cold in winters with an average snowfall of 15-30cm, however, it is very pleasant in the summers.
Two major hill streams join in the centre of the village. In the monsoon (arbitrarily 15 June to 15 August) rushing torrents often becomes more dangerous carrying flash floods and earth debris. 

A good area of the village is covered with thick forest cover mostly on the eastern side. However, they are being cut mercilessly. The recent national movement of plantations like the Billion Tree Tsunami Project (BTTP) has made an effort to rejuvenate the forests.

Accessibility
Before 1985, the only way to get to Kanshian was on foot and then a dirt road was built. People use to go there on foot carrying their luggage or mount it on mules, horses and donkeys, which they specially kept for the purpose. After the construction of the dirt road, the same process is there to this day in the small hamlets of the village.
People of Kutla Valley, (Azad Jammu and Kashmir) used the same path to reach the market in Kanshian for known times till they got connected to Muzafarabad by road.
Recently, the road is cemented and people are feeling a little at ease with their travels.

History
Though there is no authentic reference on how and when the village's first settlement started. The locally acceptable traditional theory places this vaguely in the second half of the seventeenth century CE. However, some of the archaeological sites of the so-called Hindu Shahi Period are found by the archaeologists of Hazara University.
Currently, there aren't very many people who witnessed British rule. There are verbal stories though that they only visited for trekking or to find the outlaws. 
The orthodox Sunni Muslim population of the village took part in the skirmishes fought against the forces of the "Maharaja of Kashmir", Hari Singh in different villages around Putikka in 1948. The stories of the valour of same are still enjoyed by the villagers.

Literacy
Even though the village is lacking in basic facilities with Medical and infrastructure in particular, still the population is well known for higher literacy rate. Roughly 50% of the males are graduates

First schools
The first primary schools in ( Khaitan ) was mobile to meet the demands of the seasonally migrating population in the 2005s as told by the old generation. The first permanent school started working in the 2006s in Tangri, a hamlet of the village. Only a few students were enrolled there till the 1970s.

Administration
The village of Kanshian is administratively Union Council:
Garlat .

Language

Hindko is the major language of the area with sharing its dialect to the Hindko of Balakot. The next language is Gojri. Gojjari is spoken only by the Gujjar tribe.

Cultural festival
In summer inhabitants use to migrate seasonally on the high pastures. There they organize games. Initially, these were traditional games but currently, Cricket and Cricket (KSL) Volley Ball ( KANSHIAN ) are famous.

Traditions and Traditional Games

Traditional games are now on the verge of extinction.Gatka  (Stick Fighting), Itti Danda  which is Gulli Danda in Urdu, Budkar  (Weight Lifting), etc. are such examples. These were common games however the younger generations are not interested in them. Among these, Gatka and Budkar was famously played in the marriage ceremonies. The hosts at the house of the bride used to bound the companions of the bridegroom to lift the weight which they did in front of them. The stone is said as Budkar, a weight. Another famous tradition like the same was the requirement of firing at a target set at the house of the brides. It is known as Tammanr (Urdu ) and hence the name of the game.
After the earthquake of 8 October 2005, many people migrated to Mansehra and currently these traditions are almost dead. This situation is common among the region as a whole.

Myths
There are some mythical stories that are associated with the local places.

Zare ali Tehairi 
There is a hill of red sand to the north of the village. A mound detaches to it is known as Zare ali Tehairi which means in Hindko "The mound of treasure".
Accordingly, the Hindu community of the area buried their treasures beneath this mound while they were leaving the country in hurry after partition to India. An extension of the myth says that there is a two-headed snake protecting the deposit. When the snake drinks from the nearby hill stream through the head at one end, it dries.

Bazurgan ali Gatti 
There is a huge rock in the midst of the village. It was also said to have been covering the treasures of the pre-partition/ predecessor Hindu communities. However, after the earthquake of 2005, it is replaced uncovering none.

Inhabitants
The people of the village are distributed diversely in the different hamlets but still one can count for their origin by the way they are distributed.
There are many casts but the majority can be assigned for the Gujjar tribe. They claim to be the earliest inhabitants of the village. There are Mughals linking them to Mughal dynasty, Kashmiris relating themselves to Dogras, Sayeds, Swatis and a few Pathans.

Subsistence Patterns

Initially, people depended totally on the poor farming and herding till the 60s. Currently, people are mostly employed in the education sector and economic trends are changing. Old survival patterns of relying totally on the Maize (Kharif crop) is now changed.

Major Events

Earthquake of October 2005

The village was struck hard as it was roughly on the fault line of the October Earthquake of 2005. The government and NGOs helped the locals to rehabilitate.

Catastrophic events inflected a great loss of life, property and infrastructure. It was also a devastating blow to the rich culture and traditions which died with it.

Tremors were so strong that it has changed the topography a great deal. In hamlet, 'Khaitan' (Hindko)', people claim that they can experience the changes in the shade which is caused by the nearby peak, particularly in winters.

References

External links
http://www.hu.edu.pk/?page_id=185
Hazara University Mansehra
Sarhad Tourism Corporation, Government of Khyber-Pakhtunkhwa, Pakistan
Rural Community Council (RCC) Khyber-Pakhtunkhwa, Pakistan

Populated places in Mansehra District